Pokrzywnica  is a village in Pułtusk County, Masovian Voivodeship, in east-central Poland. It is the seat of the gmina (administrative district) called Gmina Pokrzywnica.

The village has a population of 510.

References

site of Pokrzywnica

Villages in Pułtusk County